Mihai Pătrașcu (17 July 1982 – 5 June 2012) was a Romanian-American computer scientist at AT&T Labs in Florham Park, New Jersey, USA.

Pătrașcu attended Carol I National College in Craiova.
As a high school student, he won 2 gold medals and 1 silver medal at the International Olympiad in Informatics. He completed his undergraduate and graduate studies in Computer Science at Massachusetts Institute of Technology, completing his thesis under the supervision of Erik Demaine in 2008.

Pătrașcu’s work was concerned with fundamental questions about basic data structures.
Pătrașcu received the Machtey Award for the best student paper at the Symposium on Foundations of Computer Science  in 2008, and the Presburger Award from the European Association for Theoretical Computer Science in 2012, for breaking "many old barriers on fundamental data structure problems, not only revitalizing but also revolutionizing a field that was almost silent for over a decade."

Pătrașcu died in 2012 after suffering from brain cancer for a year and a half, and was buried in his native city.

Selected publications
  Preliminary version published in FOCS 2008, .
 
 
  Preliminary version published in FOCS 2006, .
  Preliminary version published in FOCS 2004, . See Tango tree.

References

External links
 Pătrașcu’s blog WebDiarios de Motocicleta
 Mihai Pătrașcu Memorial
 

1982 births
2012 deaths
People from Craiova
Carol I National College alumni
Romanian emigrants to the United States
MIT School of Engineering alumni
Romanian computer scientists
Theoretical computer scientists
Researchers in geometric algorithms
Competitive programmers
AT&T people
Deaths from brain cancer in the United States